David Todd Kearns (August 11, 1930February 25, 2011) was an American businessman who was CEO of Xerox Corporation (1982–1990) and served as the first United States Deputy Secretary of Education from 1991 to 1993.

Early life and education
Kearns was born and raised in Rochester, New York where he met his future wife, Shirley Virginia Cox. He earned Bachelor of Business Administration from the University of Rochester in 1952, where he was a member of Delta Kappa Epsilon.

Career 
Kearns entered United States Navy flight school and was deployed to the Mediterranean Sea aboard the USS Coral Sea as an airman. Starting in 1954, Kearns worked at IBM.

Xerox Corporation

In 1971, Kearns joined Xerox Corporation as Vice President. He also served as head of U.S./Marketing and Service at Xerox in Rochester, New York, and later as vice president of foreign markets in Stamford, Connecticut. In 1977, he became Xerox president and CEO. In 1985, Kearns succeeded Charles Peter McColough as chairman of Xerox.

U.S. Department of Education 

Kearns was nominated by President George H. W. Bush as United States Deputy Secretary of Education on March 22, 1991. The United States Senate confirmed him for the position on May 31, 1991.

Following the Rodney King riots in Los Angeles, California, George H. W. Bush appointed Kearns as White House liaison to help resolve the conflict.

Later career

Kearns left the Department of Education on January 20, 1993. He later joined the faculty of Harvard University's Graduate School of Education where he taught for two years. Kearns has served on the board of trustees for the Ford Foundation, Time Warner, Dayton Hudson, and Ryder. He is also a former chairman of the National Urban League.

Kearns was Chairman of New American Schools, an organization dedicated to excellence in American schools. New American Schools has since merged with the American Institutes for Research.

The University of Rochester established the David T. Kearns Center for Leadership and Diversity in Science and Engineering to expand the pool of individuals who pursue undergraduate and graduate careers in the sciences and engineering.

Kearns published several books including: Winning the Brain Race: A Bold Plan to Make Our Schools Competitive (1988), Prophets in the Dark: How Xerox Reinvented Itself and Beat Back the Japanese (1992), A Legacy of Learning (1999) and Crossing the Bridge: Family, Business, Education, Cancer, and the Lessons Learned (2005).

Personal life
Kearns lost his left eye to radiation treatment related to his cancer in 1993, prompting him to wear an eye patch for the rest of his life. Kearns and his wife, Shirley, had four daughters and two sons. They also had 18 grandchildren.

Kearns died on February 25, 2011, at the age of 80 in Vero Beach, Florida, from complications related to sinus cancer.

Awards
1990, elected to the American Philosophical Society
1991, Golden Plate Award of the American Academy of Achievement presented by Awards Council member Sol Linowitz
1992, elected to the American Academy of Arts and Sciences
1996, University of Rochester’s Hutchison Medal in 1996, the highest honor for an alumnus/a
2008, Frederick Douglass Medal, awarded jointly by the University of Rochester and the Frederick Douglass Institute for African and African-American Studies

References

External links

David T. Kearns Center for Leadership and Diversity in Arts, Sciences and Engineering

1930 births
2011 deaths
Businesspeople from Rochester, New York
University of Rochester alumni
American chief executives of Fortune 500 companies
American non-fiction writers
Harvard University faculty
IBM employees
Xerox people
United States Deputy Secretaries of Education
American chief operating officers
20th-century American businesspeople
George H. W. Bush administration personnel
Members of the American Philosophical Society